Flammes is a 2002 compilation album by the French pop act Niagara, released nine years after it broke up. It contains all the band's hit singles from its studio albums, and was released under three formats : the classic edition with a sole CD, a limited edition double CD whose second disc contains the extended versions, and a long box composed of two CD, a DVD containing the group's music videos (except for "Tchiki Boum") and a booklet with song lyrics and an overview of the band's history. This compilation topped the French Compilations Chart for three weeks and remained charted for 17 weeks (top 100). The DVD was also available as a stand-alone release.

Track listing
 CD
 "J'ai vu" – 3:52
 "Assez" – 3:44
 "Je dois m'en aller" – 3:25
 "Pendant que les champs brûlent" – 4:01
 "Quand la ville dort" – 3:48
 "Soleil d'hiver" – 4:10
 "Tchiki boum" – 3:33
 "L'amour à la plage" – 3:22
 "Flammes de l'enfer" – 4:08
 "Baby Louis" – 3:56
 "Psychotrope" – 3:37
 "Chemin de croix" – 4:35
 "La fin des étoiles" – 3:50
 "TV Addict" – 4:04
 "Un million d'années" – 4:01
 "La vie est peut-être belle" – 3:26
 "Je n'oublierai jamais" – 3:35
 "Le Minotaure" – 3:20

 Second CD - Limited edition
 "J'ai vu" (extended version) – 6:08
 "Assez" (extended version) – 5:07
 "Je dois m'en aller" (extended version) – 4:14
 "Pendant que les champs brûlent" (extended version) – 6:11
 "Quand la ville dort" (extended version) – 5:00
 "Soleil d'hiver" (extended version) – 5:56
 "Tchiki boum" (extended version) – 4:49
 "L'amour à la plage" (extended version) – 4:36
 "Flammes de l'enfer" (extended version) – 5:54
 "Baby Louis" (extended version) – 5:39
 "Psychotrope" (extended version) – 5:46
 "La fin des étoiles" (extended version) – 5:09
 "Un million d'années" (extended version) – 5:39
 "Le Minotaure" (extended version) – 7:28

 DVD - Long box - Limited edition
 "Un million d'années" (video)
 "J'ai vu" (video)
 "Pendant que les champs brûlent" (video)
 "Psychotrope" (video)
 "La vie peut être belle" (video)
 "Le Minotaure" (video)
 "Baby Louis" (video)
 "L'amour à la plage" (video)
 "Soleil d'hiver" (video)
 "Assez !" (video)
 "Je dois m'en allez" (video)
 "La fin des étoiles" (video)
 "Quand la ville dort" (video)
 "Flammes de l'enfer" (video)
 Chemin de croix - Documentary including five live performances
 Bonus : two storyboards, commentaries of the producer on two music videos

Personnel

 CD
 Written and composed by Laporte / Chevenez
 Mastering : Geoff Pesch (Townhouse)
 Photo : Fabrice Bouquet
 Booklet photos : Gilles Cappé, Catarina, Michel Figuet, Claude Gassian, Youri Lenquette, Eddie Monsoon, Lisa Peardon, Juergen Teller, Zigen
 Graphic design : Léa - Janvier
 Booklet design : Phil Design
 Management : Cyril Prieur
 Editions : Acide Music & Universal Music Publishing France

 DVD
 Universal Project responsible : Philippe Zouari
 Production : CTN
 Project coordination : Carole Di Venosa
 Graphism : Cathy Cayeux
 Sound engineer : Aurélien Bony
 Authoring : Johan Viaene and Frédéric Cagan
 Mounting : Vincent Guttmann

Charts

References

2002 greatest hits albums
Niagara (band) albums